The Rossi–Forel scale was one of the first seismic scales to represent earthquake intensities. Developed by Michele Stefano Conte de Rossi of Italy and François-Alphonse Forel of Switzerland during the late 19th century, it was used commonly for about two decades until the introduction of the Mercalli intensity scale in 1902.

The Rossi–Forel scale and/or its modifications is still used in some countries, such as the Philippines until 1996 when it was replaced by the PHIVOLCS Earthquake Intensity Scale.

Scale
The 1873 version of the Rossi–Forel scale had 10 intensity levels:

See also 
Richter magnitude scale
Seismic intensity scales
Seismic magnitude scales

Bibliography 

Seismic intensity scales